Round Table International is an international non-political and non-religious organisation for young men founded in Norwich, England, in 1927 by Louis Marchesi.  Round Table members comprise community leaders, professionals and driven individuals. This organization, initially founded for young men in England, has 30,000 active members, known as Tablers, from over 65 countries .

Round Table is part of the Round Table Family of clubs.

Description 
Round Table is an international movement with active members in most European countries and Africa, the Middle East, Asia, and the Americas. Round Table International is governed by board members elected at the various Annual General Meetings.  The board meets regularly to establish policies and make recommendations as to the overall direction of Round Table on a global basis.

Membership to Round Table is open to all men between 18 and 40 (45 in specific associations). It provides its members with a selection of social and community service related opportunities. The motto of Round Table International is "Adopt, Adapt, Improve."

The name and the motto were taken from a speech given by Edward VIII, then Prince of Wales to the British Industries Fair in 1927:

The organization interprets the motto as follows:
Adopt: The members or the Tablers adopt sound methods that have proved successful in the past.
Adapt: Tablers adapt to any situation and tackle any problem with grace. Every Tabler is a great personality having extensive knowledge and intelligence to overcome any problem.
Improve: The Tablers in the various tables worldwide strive to improve their reach, productivity. They are supported in their service by CSR funds and other sponsorships.

References

Further reading
 Barty-King, Hugh (1977), Round Table: The Search for Fellowship, London: Heinemann
 Creasey, John (1952), Round Table: The First Twenty-Five Years of the Round Table Movement, Norwich: Jarrold & Sons
 Wilkinson, Alan (2005), Continued Friendship: Sixty Years of FortyOne - The Story of The Association of Ex-Tablers' Clubs

External links 
 
 Round Table International
 Round Table India
 Round Table Great Britain and Ireland

1927 establishments in the United Kingdom
Clubs and societies in the United Kingdom
Organizations established in 1927
Service organizations